John Hugh MacMillan Sr. (August 11, 1869 – October 20, 1944) was an American businessman, president of Cargill from 1909 to 1936.

Early life
John Hugh MacMillan was born in La Crosse, Wisconsin, the son of Duncan McMillan, a director of the State Bank of La Crosse, and Mary Jane McCrea. His father's grand house was opposite a similarly grand house owned by William Wallace Cargill, and the offspring of both families played together as children.

Career
At age 15, MacMillan started work at the State Bank of La Crosse, where his father was a director.

On the death of his father-in-law, he took over the leadership of Cargill. Following a heart attack, his son, John H. MacMillan Jr. took over as president in 1936, and remained in post until his death in 1960.

Personal life
He married Edna Clara Cargill (1871–1963), the daughter of William Wallace Cargill, the founder of Cargill, and they had two sons, each of whom inherited one-third of Cargill:
 John H. MacMillan Jr. (1895–1960)
 Cargill MacMillan Sr. (1900–1968)

Later life
He died on October 20, 1944. Both he and his wife are buried at Oak Grove Cemetery, La Crosse, Wisconsin.

References

1869 births
1944 deaths
Cargill people
People from La Crosse, Wisconsin
American business executives
Businesspeople from Wisconsin